Nabila, and its variant spellings Nabeela, Nabillah,    and Nabeelah, is the feminine variation of the given name Nabil, meaning noble. Notable people with the name include:

 Masuma Rahman Nabila, Bangladeshi film actress and model
 Nabila Ebeid (born 1945), Egyptian actress
 Nabila Jamshed, Indian writer
 Nabilah Lubis (born 1942), Indonesian philologist, writer, translator and lecturer
 Nabilah Naggayi Sempala (born 1972), Ugandan politician
 Nabilah al-Tunisi (born c. 1959), chief engineer for Saudi Aramco
 Nur Atikah Nabilah (born 1991), gymnast

See also 
 
 
 Kingdom 5KR, a Benetti build superyacht previously named Nabila

References 

Feminine given names